Thomas Hardesty Campbell (1907 – 1989) was a Cumberland Presbyterian minister, a former president and dean of Memphis Theological Seminary, and a former director of the Historical Foundation of the Cumberland Presbyterian Church. Campbell retired from the seminary in 1974 and served seven years as pastor of the Harrison, Arkansas, Cumberland Presbyterian Church. He was moderator of the General Assembly of the Cumberland Presbyterian Church in 1973, and was a member of White River Presbytery, in Arkansas, for many years.

Campbell wrote several books relating to the history of the Cumberland Presbyterian denomination, and contributed to A People Called Cumberland Presbyterians, the definitive history of that denomination. His last work was Winds of Doctrine (1986), detailing his experience with a variety of theological movements which have influenced the church in the sixty years of his ministry.

1907 births
1989 deaths
Memphis Theological Seminary faculty
Cumberland Presbyterian Church ministers
Religious leaders from Tennessee